South Africa participated at the 2018 Summer Youth Olympics in Buenos Aires, Argentina from 6 October to 18 October 2018.

Archery

Individual

Team

Athletics

Canoeing

South Africa qualified two boats based on its performance at the 2018 World Qualification Event.

 Boys' K1 - 1 boat
 Girls' K1 - 1 boat

Boys

Girls

Dancesport

South Africa qualified one dancer based on its performance at the 2018 World Youth Breaking Championship.

 B-Boys - Jordan

Equestrian

South Africa qualified a rider based on its ranking in the FEI World Jumping Challenge Rankings.

 Individual Jumping - 1 athlete

Golf

Individual

Team

Gymnastics

Acrobatic
South Africa qualified a mixed pair based on its performance at the 2018 Acrobatic Gymnastics World Championship.

 Mixed pair - 1 team of 2 athletes
Rachel Nell and Sidwell Madibeng

Artistic
South Africa qualified two gymnasts based on its performance at the 2018 African Junior Championship.

 Boys' artistic individual all-around - 1 quota
Ruan Lange
 Girls' artistic individual all-around - 1 quota
Lisa Conradie

Rhythmic
South Africa qualified one gymnast based on its performance at the 2018 African Junior Championship.

 Girls' rhythmic individual all-around - 1 quota

Field hockey

Roster

Preliminary round 
Pool A

Final round 
Quarterfinal

Semifinal

Bronze-medal match

Modern pentathlon

South Africa qualified two pentathletes based on its performance at the Asian/Oceanian Youth Olympic Games Qualifier.

 Boys' Individual - Rhys Poovan
 Girls' Individual - Alida van der Merwe

Rowing

South Africa qualified two boats based on its performance at the 2017 World Junior Rowing Championships.

 Boys' single sculls - 1 athlete
 Girls' single sculls - 1 athlete

Rugby sevens

 Boys' tournament - 1 team of 12 athletes

Group stage

Bronze Medal Game

Sailing

South Africa qualified one boat based on its performance at the African and European IKA Twin Tip Racing Qualifiers.

 Girls' IKA Twin Tip Racing - 1 boat

Shooting

South Africa qualified one sport shooter based on its performance at the 2017 African Championships.

 Boys' 10m Air Rifle - 1 quota

Individual

Team

Sport climbing

South Africa qualified two sport climbers based on its performance at the 2017 World African Sport Climbing Championships.

 Boys' combined - 1 quota (David Naude)
 Girls' combined - 1 quota (Angela Eckhardt)

Swimming

Tennis

Singles

Doubles

Triathlon

South Africa qualified two athletes based on its performance at the 2018 African Youth Olympic Games Qualifier.

Individual

Relay

Weightlifting

South Africa qualified one athlete based on its performance at the 2018 African Youth Championships.

Wrestling

South Africa qualified one wrestler based on its performance at the 2018 African Cadet Championships.

Key:
  – Without any points scored by the opponent

References

2018 in South African sport
Nations at the 2018 Summer Youth Olympics
South Africa at the Youth Olympics